Amanda Brooks (born June 22, 1981) is an actress who starred in the 2007 film D-War and in the 2006 film Cut Off. She also had a leading role in the 2005 film River's End. She also starred in The Canyons as Gina.

She is the daughter of disgraced "You Light Up My Life" songwriter Joseph Brooks, from whom she was estranged. In 2013, comments she made in support of her currently incarcerated brother Nicholas made the news.

Filmography

References

External links
 
 Biography at NewYorkTimes.com (from All Movie Guide)

1981 births
Actresses from New York City
American film actresses
Living people
21st-century American women